Filodes costivitralis, the window pearl, is a moth of the family Crambidae. It is found in Réunion, Madagascar, Mauritius, and central, southern and eastern Africa.

The larvae feed on Hibiscus species and Thunbergia species, including Thunbergia grandiflora.

Occasionally the adults drink tear liquid from cattle, and can be a vector of animal diseases.

References

Spilomelinae
Moths of Madagascar
Moths of Mauritius
Moths of Réunion
Moths of Sub-Saharan Africa
Moths described in 1862